Win Myint (born 1951) is a political prisoner, the former President of Myanmar, and former Speaker of the House of Representatives of Myanmar.

Win Myint may also refer to:
 Win Myint (politician, born 1954), Burmese businessman and former government minister
 Win Pe Myint (born 1948), Burmese painter
 Win Win Myint, Burmese poet

See also
 May Win Myint, Burmese politician, physician, former political prisoner